Dani Wilde (born 25 August 1985, in Hullavington, Wiltshire, England) is a British singer-songwriter and guitarist who fuses roots genres including blues, country, gospel, soul and Americana into popular song.

The American periodical, Blues Blast, noted in 2017 that "Dani Wilde is a modern day British blues phenomenon... Live at Brighton Road is a treat for the eyes and ears... the overall effect is breathtaking".

Career
After graduating with her first class degree in Vocals at the Brighton Institute of Modern Music (BIMM) in 2005, Dani Wilde was signed to the international blues record label Ruf Records in September 2007, with the release of her debut album Heal My Blues in January 2008.

Since then, Wilde had toured across the UK, Europe, Canada, America and Africa. In 2009, she released her second album, Shine with the veteran record producer Mike Vernon. In May 2012, Wilde's third album Juice Me Up was released.

In 2015, Wilde established her own label Bri-Tone Records. Her 2015 release on her own label charted in the I-Tunes Country Music Album Charts in 10 countries including the UK, France, Germany, Spain, Italy, Switzerland, Austria, Japan and South Africa as well as the Top 30 in Finland.

Wilde has achieved three number ones in the official European I-Tunes Blues charts with her singles "Bring Your Loving Home" (album: Heal my Blues),  "Abandoned Child" (album: Shine) and "Bitch" (album: Girls with Guitars). In 2013, Wilde's single "Loving You", released on Bri-Tone Records, entered into the European Country Music Chart's Top 40. Her single Open Road peaked at number 8 in the Hungary iTunes Blues Chart in 2017, as well as the Top 30 in Switzerland and Top 40 in Iran. In September 2017, Wilde was the only British artist in the Roots Music Report Chart's Blues Top 50! She peaked at number 28, just beneath the Tedeschi Trucks Band. On 11 October 2017, following BBC Radio 2 airplay and the support of many independent radio stations, Wilde's song "Deeper Than Black" from her album Live at Brighton Road peaked at Number 5 in the British I-Tunes Blues Chart, placing her alongside her contemporaries Van Morrison, Beth Hart, Joe Bonamassa and Jonny Lang.

Wilde has had regular airplay on The Paul Jones Show on BBC Radio 2, and has been a featured artist for BBC Radio 2's Maida Vale Live Sessions on four occasions.

In 2015, Wilde was awarded Best Female Vocalist at The British Blues Awards.

From 2015 until 2016, Wilde worked as a columnist for Classic Rock 's 'The Blues Mag'. Her column 'Wilde About The Blues' celebrates the lives and achievements of blues women throughout history. She currently writes about phenomenal blues women in history for Blues Matters magazine

In July 2016, Wilde's self-penned pop song "R U Sweet On Me" was featured in NBC's drama series Aquarius. The TV series Sex & Drugs & Rock & Roll starred David Duchovny as a fictional LAPD detective investigating the case of a missing teenage girl, who is found to be with serial killer Charles Manson and his family. The series soundtrack included Wilde's "R U Sweet On Me". The song which featured Wilde on lead vocals and Fergus Gerrand on drums, was originally composed for Amy Winehouse's god daughter, Dionne Bromfield, for a Disney movie proposal.

In 2017, Wilde signed to VizzTone Group. Her debut for the label Live at Brighton Road was released in June 2017. Live at Brighton Road was mastered by Jon Astley. The album performances were filmed by Philip James and is available as a special edition CD and DVD set as well a vinyl LP and digital download. In March 2020 Wilde resigned with Vizztone Label and released a new single "Howling At The Moon" Blues Blast magazine noted that "Dani Wilde is a modern day British blues phenomenon... Live at Brighton Road is a treat for the eyes and ears... the overall effect is breathtaking".

Wilde is endorsed by Rotosound Guitar Strings. She is also part of the group Girls With Guitars and is endorsed by Fender USA.

Collaborations
In January 2017, Wilde was featured as a special guest on a recording featuring Kiko Garcia, Jeff Asselin and Brian Asselin. Wilde wrote the chorus section of the song entitled "Stop", and contributed lead and backing vocals.

Wilde has collaborated with a number of artists during her career. In the 2010 WOMAD festival, Wilde performed live alongside Pee Wee Ellis. Wilde has also performed on stage with Christopher Holland as the opening act for Jools Holland at The Royal Albert Hall. Other acts Wilde has opened for include Journey, Foreigner, Johnny Winter and Robben Ford. She has also shared stages with Lazy Lester and Debbie Davies, and shared the bill with Bobby Womack, Bobby Bland, Koko Taylor, Tedeschi Trucks Band and Sound Garden.

In 2008, Wilde toured The UK, Europe and the USA with Candye Kane, Sue Foley and Deborah Coleman on Ruf Records 'Guitared and Feathers Blues Caravan tour'.
In 2011, Wilde collaborated with Samantha Fish and Cassie Taylor on the Ruf Records 'Girls with Guitars Blues Caravan World Tour'. That year, they also recorded and released a studio album Girls with Guitars. In 2012, the tour schedule continued and the group released a live CD/DVD with British bassist Victoria Smith replacing Cassie Taylor.

In 2016, Wilde performed live in Brighton with the Malian singer, Vieux Farka Touré, the son of Ali Farka Touré.

Humanitarian work
Wilde is an advocate for children's rights. She has worked with the charity "Moving Mountains" to help improve education for street children and orphans in Embu, Kenya.

Discography

Albums
 2008: Heal My Blues  – CD –  Ruf Records
 2011: Shine – CD – Ruf Records
 2011: Girls With Guitars  – CD – Ruf Records
 2012: Juice Me Up  – CD – Ruf Records
 2012: Girls With Guitars Live – DVD – Ruf Records
 2015: Songs About You – CD –  Bri-Tone Records
 2017: Live at Brighton Road – CD/DVD and Vinyl LP release – VizzTone Label Group

Singles
 2012: "R U Sweet On Me" (download only)
 2013: "Loving You" (download only)
 2013: "Love Hurts" (download only)
 2017: "Stop" (with Kiko Garcia and Brian Asselin – promotional release)
 2017: "Deeper Than Black" (From the album Live at Brighton Road – VizzTone Label Group)
 2020: "Howling At The Moon" – Vizztone Label Group

References

External links

1985 births
Living people
British women singer-songwriters
British blues singers
British blues guitarists
Musicians from Wiltshire
21st-century British singers
Ruf Records artists